Malankara Syriac Knanaya Community are part of the larger Knanaya community who are descendants of an endogamous ethnic migrant group of Syriac-Jewish Christians who arrived and settled in Kerala in the 4th or 8th century.

In the year 345 according to the Malayalam calendar (Kollavarsham), Knai Thoma, a merchant, and 72 families from Edessa (or modern Urfa) immigrated to Malankara (present-day  Kerala) and established a community there. Among the group were priests, deacons and a bishop, Uraha Mar Ouseph (Bishop Joseph of Uraha/Urfa). Knai Thoma and his people were welcomed by Cheraman Perumal, the Chera  Emperor of Kerala, and were given permission to settle down in Kodungalloor.

After the Coonen Cross Revolt. (Oath of the Bent Cross)a part of the Knanaya Community joined Archdeacon Thomas. They later accepted West Syriac liturgical traditions brought to Malankara by Mor Gregorios Abdal Jaleel of Jerusalem. This group later came under the Patriarch of Antioch. Today they form part of the Knanaya Archdiocese of the Syrian Orthodox Church.

List of Knanaya Syrian Church
The Knanaya Syrians are Jewish migrants who believed in Syriac Orthodox Church primacy. They have communities in Allapuzha Pathanamthitta and Kottayam of Kerala and abroad.

See also

 Syro-Malabar Catholic Archeparchy of Kottayam

References

External links
Knanaya Resources
Knanayadiocese.org
Knanaya Jacobites fight for the control of Ranni Valiapally church

Christianity in Kerala
Syriac Orthodox dioceses
Knanaya Community